Franklin Township is one of the 25 townships of Licking County, Ohio, United States. As of the 2010 census the population was 2,118, up from 1,782 at the 2000 census.

Geography
Located in the southeastern part of the county, it borders the following townships and city:
Madison Township - north
Hanover Township - northeast corner
Hopewell Township - east
Bowling Green Township - south
Licking Township - west
Heath - northwest

Name and history
It is one of twenty-one Franklin Townships statewide.

Government
The township is governed by a three-member board of trustees, who are elected in November of odd-numbered years to a four-year term beginning on the following January 1. Two are elected in the year after the presidential election and one is elected in the year before it. There is also an elected township fiscal officer, who serves a four-year term beginning on April 1 of the year after the election, which is held in November of the year before the presidential election. Vacancies in the fiscal officership or on the board of trustees are filled by the remaining trustees.

References

External links

County website

Townships in Licking County, Ohio
Townships in Ohio